Philo T. Farnsworth is a bronze sculpture depicting the American inventor and television pioneer of the same name by James Avati, installed at the United States Capitol Visitor Center's Emancipation Hall, in Washington, D.C., as part of the National Statuary Hall Collection. The statue was gifted by the U.S. state of Utah in 1990.

See also
 1990 in art

References

External links
 

1990 establishments in Washington, D.C.
Bronze sculptures in Washington, D.C.
Monuments and memorials in Washington, D.C.
Farnsworth
Sculptures of men in Washington, D.C.